Adam Greenberg, A.S.C. (Hebrew: אדם גרינברג) is a retired Israeli-American cinematographer noted for his work in his native Israel and the United States, including several films starring Arnold Schwarzenegger. Greenberg has collaborated with numerous well-known and acclaimed filmmakers, including James Cameron, Andrew Davis, Kathryn Bigelow, David Perlov, and Ivan Reitman.

Greenberg was nominated for the Academy Award for Best Cinematography in 1992, for his work on Terminator 2: Judgment Day. In 1999 he was a member of the jury at the 21st Moscow International Film Festival.

Life and career 
Greenberg was raised in Tel Aviv, Israel. He began work as a film lab technician in 1958. While working as a newsreel and cameraman in the early 1960s, he worked with filmmaker David Perlov on his 33-minute documentary In Jerusalem (בירושלים, Be-Yerushalayim).

His first job as director of photography came in the form of The Flying Matchmaker, an Israeli musical film based on an operetta by Abraham Goldfaden. The film was selected as the Israeli entry into the Academy Awards for Best Foreign Language Film, but was ultimately not nominated. Greenberg shot several well-received and popular films in Israel, soon becoming one of the most noteworthy individuals in the country's film industry, beginning a long-term collaboration with prolific filmmaking duo Menahem Golan and Yoram Globus. Their coming-of-age comedy drama Lemon Popsicle was a massive success, quickly becoming the highest-grossing film in Israeli history and spawning numerous sequels and spin-offs. Greenberg's first American film was the 1980 World War II epic, shot on location in Israel and Ireland, The Big Red One. Afterwards, Greenberg emigrated to the United States, gaining citizenship three years later. Though he worked almost exclusively in Hollywood thereafter, he continued to work with Golan-Globus for years.

In 1982, Greenberg shot The Last American Virgin, an English-language remake of Lemon Popsicle with much of the same creative team. The film failed to match the same level of success as its predecessor however, and the planned sequels failed to materialize. Two years later, he shot the James Cameron-directed science fiction action film The Terminator, which became an unexpected success with both critics and audiences, spawning a highly-profitable franchise and propelling its star Arnold Schwarzenegger to stardom. Greenberg went on to become a highly prolific director of photography, working primarily in the comedy and thriller genres. Some of these films include the military action film Iron Eagle, the cult vampire Western Near Dark, the neo-noir science fiction thriller Alien Nation, the Best Picture-nominated romantic fantasy film Ghost, Three Men and a Baby and Sister Act.

In 1991, Greenberg re-teamed with James Cameron to shoot Terminator 2: Judgment Day, the sequel to The Terminator. It was a massive success critically and financially, winning four Academy Awards (Best Makeup and Hairstyling, Best Sound Mixing, Best Sound Editing, Best Visual Effects) and two BAFTAs. The film earned over $519 million worldwide and remains one of the highest grossing films of all time. Greenberg received an Oscar nomination for Best Cinematography for his work on the film. This was his second time working with Arnold Schwarzenegger, and the two went on to collaborate several more times with Junior, Eraser, and Collateral Damage.

Greenberg's latest film had him returning to his native Israel with Footsteps in Jerusalem, an homage to David Perlov that combined In Jerusalem with nine other short documentaries as a means to explore the massive changes Jerusalem has undergone through the decades.

Greenberg re-teamed with director James Cameron to oversee the 3-D conversion of Terminator 2, set for theatrical release in 2017.

Filmography

References

External links
 
 

Living people
Polish cinematographers
Polish emigrants to the United States
American people of Polish-Jewish descent
Israeli cinematographers
Israeli people of Polish-Jewish descent
American people of Israeli descent
Year of birth missing (living people)